High Class is a 2021 South Korean television series directed by Choi Byeong-gil and starring Cho Yeo-jeong, Kim Ji-soo and Kim Young-jae. The series depicts the lies, secret, mystery, suspense and hypocrisy hidden behind the perfect lives of South Korea's top 0.1% women. It premiered on tvN on September 6, 2021, and aired every Monday and Tuesday at 22:30 (KST) till November 1. The series is available on IQIYI for streaming in selected locations.

The series ended with highest rating of 5.7% for the final episode as per Nielsen Korea.

Synopsis
It is about the fibs and hypocrisies hidden behind the perfect lives of the women who live in the top 0.1 percent bracket of the society. It builds the suspense and mystery around those who live it.

Song Yeo-ul (Cho Yeo-jeong) is framed for her husband's murder and she loses everything. Nam Ji-seon (Kim Ji-soo) is the star among the mothers at the international school where the children of elite go. Danny (Ha Jun), a former ice hockey player is a teacher at the school. Hwang Na-yoon (Park Se-jin), a single mother who is the only one friendly to Song Yeo-ul. Cha Do-yeong (Gong Hyun-joo), a washed-out actress follows Nam Ji-seon around because she wants to be in the limelight.

Cast

Main
 Cho Yeo-jeong as Song Yeo-ul, in late 30s, a former lawyer. She was suspected to be murderer in her husband's disappearance as her husband went missing during a trip on a yacht with only her being on yacht with him all night.
 Kim Ji-soo as Nam Ji-seon, 
 Hotel Locanda President & CEO, HSC International School PTA Parent Representative, she controls public opinion at the international school
 Park Se-jin as Hwang Na-yoon, a single mom
 Song Yeo-ul's only assistant and CEO of J&Y Gallery. It is known that Hwang Na-yoon returned from Hong Kong with a daughter without a husband. But she did not reveal her true feelings.
 Gong Hyun-joo as Cha Do-yeong
 A top actress turned celebrity, a former Miss Korea. She clings to Ji-seon and tries to become a real celebrity like her. she runs Salon de 愛, a restaurant jointly with star chef Jung Mi-do
  Ha Jun as Danny Oh/Oh Soon-sang, an ice hockey player-turned-teacher. He is very sweet and caring to Song Yeo Wool. He coaches Song's son despite the opposition of other mums.

Supporting

People around Song Yeo-ul 
 Jang Sun-yool as Ahn Yi-chan, 8 year old, Yeo-ul's son

People around Nam Ji-seon 
 Kim Young-jae as Lee Jeong-woo, in early 40s
Nam Ji-seon's second husband who is a famous cosmetics surgeon in Gangnam
 Kim Ji-yoo as Lee Jun-hee, 8 years old daughter of Nam Ji-seon
 Choi Bo-geun as Lee Jun-mo, age 16
Nam Ji-seon's son, HSC International School, in G 9
 Lee Chae-min as Ahn Seung-jo, assistant to Nam Ji-seon

People around Hwang Na-yoon 
 Park So-yi as Hwang Jae-in, 8 years old
Na-yoon Hwang's daughter, HSC International School in G1

People around Cha Do-yeong 
 Choi Sung-joon as Kwak Sang-geon
A chaebol from the third generation of ventures. He is married to Cha Do-young. They were star couple once but now are just a show couple.
 Seo Yun-hyuk as Kwak Shi-woo, 8 years old
Kwak Sang-geon and Do-yeong's son, HSC International School in G1
 Kim Jin-yeop as Jung Mi-do in mid 30s 
Restaurant Salon de 愛 co-owner and star chef

HSC International School 
 Woo Hyun-joo as Do Jin-seol, the president of the International School Foundation
 Yoon In-jo as Bang Young-joo, a media group voice actor and media wife 
 Kang Kang-jung as Seong-kyung-ah
The youngest member of a group, her husband is a member of the National Assembly. She is first-year parent at HSC International School.
 Lee Jeong-Yeol as Han Geon-Young in late 50s
Head of HSC International School
 Lee Ga-eun as Rachel Cho, a Canadian-born HSC International School teacher
 Kim Seong-tae as Alex Comer in 30s
Director of Finance, HSC International Schools Foundation

Others  
 Kwon Hyuk as Ku Young-ho
 police detective who confronts Song Yeo-ul.
 Seo Jeong-yeon as Shim Ae-soon, a maid for VIP-only townhouses

Special appearance 
 Kim Nam-hee as Ahn Ji-yong
 Song Yeo-ul's deceased husband and the representative of an asset management company. He was a loving husband and father. However, he disappeared and died in a mysterious yacht accident and made Song Yeo-wool fall into a nightmare-like reality as she begins to uncover the secrets he was hiding related to his death.
 Park Eun-hye as 'Sejun-mam'
 She fires the signal of the conflict over Song Yeo-ul in the international school (Ep.1)

Production
On March 11, 2021, tvN confirmed that Cho Yeo-jeong, Kim Ji-soo, Ha Joon, Park Se-jin, and Kong Hyun-joo will be appearing in the drama High-class. Later in March Kim Young-jae, Lee Ga-eun, Lee Chae-min and Kim Ji-yoo joined the cast. On July 28, the script reading site was revealed.

Filming
On June 9, 2021, Gong Hyun-joo posted photos from the filming of the drama.

Original soundtrack

Part 1

Part 2

Part 3

Part 4

Viewership

Notes

References

External links
  
 High Class at Naver 
 High Class at Daum 
 
 
 High Class at iQiyi

TVN (South Korean TV channel) television dramas
2021 South Korean television series debuts
2021 South Korean television series endings
Korean-language television shows
South Korean mystery television series
South Korean suspense television series